Terek is the name of several inhabited localities in Russia.

Urban localities
Terek, Kabardino-Balkar Republic, a town in Tersky District of the Kabardino-Balkar Republic

Rural localities
Terek, Stavropol Krai, a settlement in Starodubsky Selsoviet of Budyonnovsky District of Stavropol Krai